Riccardi is an Italian surname. Notable people with the surname include:

 Alessio Riccardi (born 2001), Italian footballer
 Andrea Riccardi (born 1950), Italian church leader
 Arturo Riccardi (1878–1966), Italian Navy admiral
 Davide Riccardi (rower) (born 1986), Italian lightweight rower
 Franco Riccardi (1905–1968), Italian fencer
 Giulio Cesare Riccardi (died 1602), Roman Catholic Archbishop of Bari-Canosa and Apostolic Nuncio to Savoy
 Jake Riccardi (born 1999), Australian rules footballer
 John Riccardi (born 1935), American criminal who murdered the mother of rock guitarist Dave Navarro in 1983
 Luigi Riccardi (1807–1877), Italian painter
 Marco Riccardi (born 1982), Argentine former field hockey player
 Marcos Riccardi (born 1982), Argentinian field hockey player
 Marino Riccardi (born 1958), San Marino politician
 Michael Riccardi (born 1963), American attempted killer of Al Sharpton
 Niccolò Riccardi (1585-1636), Italian Dominican theologian and preacher, involved in the Galileo affair
 Peter Riccardi (born 1972), Australian rules footballer
 Romain Riccardi (born 1988), Italian male BMX rider
 Tommaso Riccardi (1844-1915), Blessed, Italian Roman Catholic priest and member of the Cassinese Congregation

Other
 Atletica Riccardi, Italian athletics club based in Milan

Italian-language surnames
Patronymic surnames
Surnames from given names